Coldwater River is a  stream in the U.S. state of Michigan. Located in Isabella County, the river rises as the outflow of Littlefield Lake in western Gilmore Township.

Major tributaries (from the mouth):
Coldwater Lake, in Nottawa Township
Lake of the Hills, in Nottawa and Sherman townships
Walker Creek, rises in south central Coldwater Township
Colley Creek, rises in southwest Coldwater Township
Delaney Creek, rises in north central Coldwater Township
Littlefield Lake in western Gilmore Township
Sucker Creek, rises in northwest Gilmore Township

References

Rivers of Michigan
Rivers of Isabella County, Michigan
Tributaries of Lake Huron